Binodini Dasi (1863–1941), also known as Notee Binodini, was an Indian Bengali actress and thespian. She started acting at the age of 12 and ended by the time she was 23, as she later recounted in her noted autobiography, Amar Katha (The Story of My Life) published in 1913.

Biography 
Born to prostitution, she started her career as a courtesan and at age twelve she played her first serious drama role in Calcutta's National Theatre in 1874, under the mentorship of its founder, Girish Chandra Ghosh. Her career coincided with the growth of the proscenium-inspired form of European theatre among the Bengali theatre going audience. During a career spanning twelve years she enacted over eighty roles, which included those of Pramila, Sita, Draupadi, Radha, Ayesha, Kaikeyi, Motibibi, and Kapalkundala, among others. She was one of the first South Asian actresses of the theatre to write her own autobiography. Her sudden retirement from the stage is insufficiently explained.
Her autobiography has a consistent thread of betrayal. She violates every canon of the feminine smritikatha and wrote down what amounted to her indictment of respectable society.
Ramakrishna, the great saint of 19th century Bengal, came to see her play in 1884. She was a pioneering entrepreneur of the Bengali stage and introduced modern techniques of stage make-up through blending European and indigenous styles.

In popular culture
 In Dinen Gupta's Bengali film Nati Binodini (1994), Debashree Roy played the character.
 Nati Binodini, a play based on her autobiography, Aamar Kathaa was first presented by National School of Drama Repertory Company in 1995 with the lead role played by actor, Seema Biswas, then in 2006, noted theatre director Amal Allana directed a play by the same name which premiered in Delhi.
 In Abohomaan, directed by Rituparno Ghosh, the role of Binodini was essayed by Ananya Chatterjee.
 In Kadambari (2015), by Suman Ghosh, the role was essayed by Sreelekha Mitra.
 In Prothoma Kadambini, Diya Mukherjee is currently portraying the role of Nati Binodini.
 Tuhinabha Majumdar directed "Aamaar Katha: Story of Binodini" , A documentary based on her autobiography.
 In upcoming film Binodini: Ekti Natir Upakhyan, directed by Ram Kamal Mukherjee, the role of Nati Binodini will be essayed by Rukmini Maitra.

References

Sources

Further reading 
 Binodini Dasi: My Story and My Life as an Actress. Edited and translated by Rimli Bhattacharya. New Delhi: Kali for Women, 1998.

External links

 Binodini: an immortal tale

1862 births
1941 deaths
Feminist artists
Writers from Kolkata
Indian stage actresses
20th-century Indian women writers
Indian autobiographers
Indian courtesans
Indian female prostitutes
Women autobiographers
19th-century Indian actresses
20th-century Indian actresses
People from British India
19th-century Indian women writers
19th-century Indian writers
Indian women non-fiction writers
Women biographers
19th-century Indian biographers
Women writers from West Bengal
Actresses from Kolkata
20th-century Indian biographers